Hakim Arezki (born 20 March 1983) is a French football 5-a-side player who competes in international blind football tournaments, he plays as defender and midfielder. He is a Paralympic silver medalist and a European champion.

Disability
On 27 April 2001, 18 year old Arezki took part in a peace march in his hometown of Azazga following a number of riots in Kabylia in the past month. The demonstrators marched in front of the gendarmerie and the gendarmerie began shooting at the demonstrators, three people were fatally hit including one of Arezki's childhood friends. Arezki ran with the group of demonstrators and was shot in his Achilles tendon and in his temple, if he hadn't turned his head around then he would've been shot in the forehead. He was taken to the hospital in the town and was overwhelmed by the casualties' serious injuries so he was transported to Mustapha-Pasha hospital in Algiers. The riot caused 129 deaths and thousands were wounded including Arezki.

Two days later, 29 April, Arezki was admitted to a Parisian hospital by air ambulance. He was taken into surgery as soon as he arrived, the surgeons took a lot of considerable time to decide whether to amputate his foot but fortunately they managed to save his foot, his second operation was to remove the three bullet fragments in his head but the surgeons discovered that one of the fragments had severed his optic nerve which caused Arezki to have permanent sight loss.

Months later, Arezki joined in a specialised centre for the blind in France where he taught how to read Braille, learned to play piano and guitar, he was also introduced to blind football which gave him passion to play football and he joined several football clubs since 2009 then joined France's national football 5-a-side team in 2010. He participated at the 2012 Summer Paralympics where he won a silver medal, he participated again at the 2020 Summer Paralympics and finished in eighth place.

References

External links
 
 

1983 births
Living people
People from Azazga
Algerian emigrants to France
French footballers
Paralympic 5-a-side footballers of France
5-a-side footballers at the 2012 Summer Paralympics
5-a-side footballers at the 2020 Summer Paralympics
Medalists at the 2012 Summer Paralympics
French blind people